The November 2000 Hawaii floods were a costly flooding event caused by an upper-level low and the remnants of Tropical Storm Paul, a weak and short-lived tropical cyclone. Rainfall totals reached 38.76 in (985 mm) at Kapapala Ranch on the Big Island of Hawaii, which was the second highest precipitation total in the state related to a tropical cyclone. The floods led to $70 million (2000 USD; $  USD) in damage, but there were no fatalities.

Meteorological history
Tropical Storm Paul formed on October 25 from the Intertropical Convergence Zone to the southwest of Mexico, and it dissipated four days later without becoming a significant tropical cyclone. The remnants of Paul reached the Hawaiian Islands in early November 2000, and interacted with an upper-level low, dropping very heavy rains from November 1 to November 3.

On the island of Hawaii, more commonly referred to as "the Big Island", roughly the entire eastern half of the island experienced rainfall of at least 10 in (254 mm), while the western side reported generally less than 5 in (127 mm) or less. Near Ka Lae, the southernmost point in the United States, rainfall reached nearly 5 in (127 mm). Rainfall peaked at an extreme amount of 38.76 in (985 mm) at Kapapala Ranch. In addition, the 24 hour rainfall total reached 37 in (940 mm), which is just 1 in (25 mm) shy of the record amount of precipitation in the state of Hawaii set on January 25, 1956. That total was the second-highest tropical cyclone-related rainfall total in the state, although well behind Hurricane Hiki of 1950, which dropped 52 in (1321 mm).

Impact and records

The most affected districts were Hilo, Ka’u and Puna, and the flooding damaged homes, businesses, roads, and public facilities. Near Pahala, the flooding cut a portion of Route 11, leaving the city's fire station only accessible by helicopter. The flooding caused several mudslides across the island of Hawaii, and most schools and businesses were closed. Additionally, dozens of people were forced to evacuate.

The Red Cross indicated that the 33 homes and apartments were destroyed as a result of the flood, and another 265 sustaining damage. Some bridges were damaged during the flooding, which temporarily closed several roads and highways on the southeast side of the island of Hawaii. The flooding resulted in $70 million (2000 USD; $  USD) worth of property damage, but no fatalities were reported. Four people required rescuing after flood waters entered their house.

Few reports of impact exist other than on the island of Hawaii, although reports of stream and minor street flooding was observed on the islands of Molokai, Lanai, Maui, and on the eastern side of Oahu.

Aftermath 

On November 3, shortly after the flooding, a state of emergency was declared for the island of Hawaii. The same day, then-Hawaiian Governor Ben Cayetano also declared a state of emergency. Because of the extreme flooding, then-United States President Bill Clinton declared the island of Hawaii as a disaster area, allowing the victims to receive aid from the federal government.

The county government of the Big Island spent $8.7 million (2000 USD) in repairs, primarily to bridges and flood controls. In Hilo, crews worked quickly to remove mud and debris from roadways, and in Pahala, the county government constructed a temporary  bypass road in just one week.

On November 13 and November 15, the Federal Emergency Management Agency (FEMA) and Hawaii State Civil Defense opened disaster recovery centers in Hilo and Pahala, respectively, to provide the affected people with information about disaster assistance programs, among other details; by the end of November, 1,168 people visited the centers. In the week after the flooding, the American Red Cross sheltered 214 people, providing a total of 1289 meals. By December 4, 1,131 island residents applied for federal assistance. The registration for federal assistance ended on January 8, 2001, by which time over 2,000 people applied for assistance, and the Small Business Administration approved $4.6 million in low-interest disaster loans. Over 1,100 people applied for over $2.4 million in temporary housing checks for rent or minimal repairs, and over $1.1 million in grants were approved for those with serious, disaster-related needs. Overall, federal disaster assistance totaled $88 million for Hawaii, due to the flooding event.

See also

2000 Pacific hurricane season
Hurricane Lane (2018)
Hurricane Douglas (2020)

References

2000 Pacific hurricane season
Floods in Hawaii
2000
November 2000 events in the United States
2000 in Hawaii